David Feldman (born 1950) is the author of the Imponderables series of books.

He holds a bachelor's degree in literature from Grinnell College, as well as a master's degree in popular culture from Bowling Green State University.

External links
A brief biography at imponderables.com

1950 births
Bowling Green State University alumni
Watson Fellows
Grinnell College alumni
Living people
Place of birth missing (living people)
Date of birth missing (living people)